Connie's Inn was a Harlem, New York City, black and tan nightclub established in 1923 by Connie Immerman (né Conrad Immerman; 1893–1967) in partnership with two of his brothers, George (1884–1944) and Louie Immerman (1882–1955).

History 
Having immigrated from Latvia, the Immerman brothers operated a Harlem delicatessen and made their fortune as bootleggers. Their club was located at 2221 Seventh Avenue at 131st Street in a basement from 1923 until 1934. Acts performing there included Louis Armstrong, Fats Waller, Wilbur Sweatman, Peg Leg Bates, Bricktop and Fletcher Henderson. Like the Cotton Club, Connie's Inn featured African American performers but restricted its audience to whites only. Its steep cover charge of $2.50, its intimate atmosphere, and its ability to hire famous entertainers made the club unique among other New York clubs. Members of the Ziegfeld Follies, heiress Gertrude Vanderbilt, and numerous others poured in from downtown to enjoy the shows at Connie's Inn and were sometimes influential in moving their revues to Broadway. Connie Immerman was instrumental in the design and the promotion of the revues, including the famous Hot Chocolates revue. Leonard Harper became the Connie's Inn in-house producer during its glory days.

In the early 1930s, the Immermans moved Connie's Inn to a downtown location. There, they produced one of their last great revues, Stars Over Broadway, which starred Billie Holiday, and featured Bessie Smith as a temporary fill-in for Holiday when she was ill.

The Great Depression forced Connie's Inn to close and the Immerman brothers to obtain individual employment. With a change in ownership, Connie's Inn became Club Harlem. In April 1934, the Harlem site re-opened as the Club Ubangi and featured lesbian, gay and bisexual entertainers such as Gladys Bentley and comedian Jackie Mabley, later known as Moms Mabley

References
 Allen, Irving L. The City in Slang: New York Life and Popular Speech. New York: Oxford University Press (1993), pg. 75; 
 Wintz, Cary D., and Paul Finkelman. Encyclopedia of the Harlem Renaissance. New York: Routledge (2004), pg. 581; 
 Lerner, Michael A. Dry Manhattan – Prohibition in New York City. Harvard University Press (2007), pg. 216;

Inline citations 

African-American cultural history
Nightclubs in Manhattan
Harlem
1923 establishments in New York City
Former music venues in New York City
Defunct jazz clubs in New York City
Delicatessens in the United States